Tahir Albakaa (born 1950 in Takir, Iraq)  is an Iraqi historian who received his Master's degree and Ph.D in Modern History from Baghdad University.

Albakaa worked at Al-Mustansiriya University from 1983 to 2003 and is the former President of the University. In June 2004 he was chosen as a Minister of Higher Education and Scientific Research for the Iraqi Interim Government.  Albakaa was a member of the Iraqi National Assembly in 2005, and a member of the Iraqi Constitution Writing Committee.

In October 2005 he went to Harvard University as a visiting scholar, and then moved to Suffolk University in 2006.

He has published six books and sixty-five papers.

References

External links
Tahir Albakaa Official Website

20th-century Iraqi historians
Academic staff of Al-Mustansiriya University
Living people
1950 births
Academic staff of the University of Baghdad
University of Baghdad alumni
Harvard University staff
Suffolk University faculty
Iraqi expatriates in the United States
21st-century Iraqi historians